Fluvicola is a genus of birds in the tyrant flycatcher family Tyrannidae.

The genus was introduced by the English naturalist William John Swainson in 1827. He designated the type species as the masked water tyrant (Fluvicola nengeta) in 1831. The genus name is derived from a combination of Latin fluvius meaning "river" and -cola meaning "dweller".

Species
The genus contains the following three species:

References

 
Bird genera
Taxonomy articles created by Polbot